Something Evil is a 1972 American TV movie starring Sandy Dennis, Darren McGavin and Ralph Bellamy. Directed by Steven Spielberg, the screenplay was written by Robert Clouse.

Plot
A married couple with two young children move into a Pennsylvania farmhouse that turns out to be inhabited by demons. Paul is a TV producer and his wife Marjorie is an artist. The home and countryside seem idyllic until strange things start to occur. The sound of a baby's crying wakes Marjorie several times and ultimately leads to a creepy discovery. Paul's colleague and an employee die in a mysterious accident when driving away from the farmhouse. Harry attempts to warn the family about the potential evil possessing their property. Marjorie becomes slowly unravelled. She believes that the evil in the house is possessing her and wants to leave. She believes she has become a danger to her children, but an ex-farmhand enlightens her to the real source of danger.

Cast
 Sandy Dennis as Marjorie Worden
 Darren McGavin as Paul Worden
 Ralph Bellamy as Harry Lincoln
 Jeff Corey as Gehrmann
 Johnny Whitaker as Stevie Worden
 John Rubinstein as Ernest Lincoln
 David Knapp as John
 Laurie Hagen as Beth
 Herb Armstrong as Schiller
 Margaret Avery as Irene
 Norman Bartold as Mr. Hackett
 Sheila Bartold as Mrs. Hackett
 Lois Battle as Mrs. Faraday
 Bella Bruck as Mrs. Gehrmann
 Lynn Cartwright as Secretary

Filming locations
 Golden Oak Ranch, Newhall, California
 Studio City, California

Production
Spielberg created Something Evil immediately after his television movie Duel (1971), and it aired in January 1972.

Reception
While the majority of critics have dismissed Something Evil, Neil Sinyard wrote: "Spielberg's direction is nothing short of magnificent. There are splendid montages as mother [Sandy Dennis] paints and creates models and mobiles that will eventually be significant in resisting the evil spells; dazzling dissolves and sinister camera placement for stealthy, apprehensive entrances into fearful places; and...a Hitchcockian sense of the moment to throw away explanatory dialogue (the explanation for the house's past) when it is less interesting than the mystery and menace."

Song
The movie features the "Apple Bar Candy Song" by Charlie Marie Gordon. It appears in the film performed by Laurie Hagen for a commercial that Darren McGavin's character is filming. The song has been spoofed several times.

References

External links
 
  Something Evil
 

1972 television films
1972 films
1972 horror films
1970s horror thriller films
American horror thriller films
American haunted house films
Films directed by Steven Spielberg
CBS network films
American horror television films
1970s English-language films
1970s American films